Je vous écris d'Italie ("I write to you from Italy") is a 1984 novel by the French writer Michel Déon. It is set in Italy in the summer of 1949 and follows a young French historian who tries to solve a mystery connected to a secret pagan festival. The novel received the Prix Maison de la Presse.

Plot
Jacques Sauvage is a young French historian and Stendhal enthusiast. He fought for the French army during World War II and briefly visited the small town Varela in Umbria, Italy, in 1945. He returns to the area four years later in hope of being able to solve a mystery connected to the historically rich surroundings. The key to the mystery is a pagan festival which the locals are preparing in secret.

References

External links
 Publicity page at the French publisher's website 

1984 French novels
French-language novels
Novels by Michel Déon
Novels set in Italy
Éditions Gallimard books